John Anthony Notte Jr. (May 3, 1909 – March 7, 1983) was an American politician, a Democrat, best known for serving as the 65th Governor of Rhode Island.

Biography
A son of John Anthony Notte and Eva Theresa (Rondina) Notte, he was born in Providence, Rhode Island. He was married to Marie J. Huerth in 1934. The couple had two children together.

Notte graduated from the Boston University Law School in 1935. He went on to practice law and served as town solicitor in North Providence in 1937.  During his undergraduate years, Notte joined Alpha Phi Delta.

During World War II he served in the United States Navy and rose to the rank of lieutenant. Just after return to home he was elected Chairman of the Rhode Island Veterans' Bonus Board.  From 1949 to 1950 he served as State Commander of the Rhode Island Department of the Veterans of Foreign Wars.

He later served as a member of staff of Senator Theodore F. Green from 1948 to 1956, and as Chairman of the North Providence Democratic town committee.

Notte resigned from Green's staff after he was elected Secretary of State, a post he held from 1957 to 1958. He was a delegate to the 1960 Democratic National Convention and became the 57th Lieutenant Governor of Rhode Island in 1959 and served until 1961 under Republican Christopher Del Sesto (Rhode Island Governor and his deputy are elected at the separate ballots).

Governorship
Notte was elected Governor in 1960, defeating Del Sesto, and held this post from January 3, 1961 to January 1, 1963 – one single two-year term.

Under his administration, a family court was established and Rhode Island held its first one-day, one-place Democratic and Republican primaries.

He appointed Leonard Holland as state Adjutant General early in his term.  Holland would lead the Rhode Island National Guard for the next 22 years.

He was defeated for re-election by Republican John Chafee in the state's tightest gubernatorial race ever – a margin of under 400 votes. His defeat coincided with a lack of support from labor unions (he was the first Democratic Governor running without labor support), because of his support for a state income tax.

Later life
After he left office, he returned to his law practice and sought the Democratic nomination in the special election to the United States House of Representatives in 1967 but lost the primary.

Notte died on March 7, 1983, at the age of 73 and was buried in St. Francis Cemetery in Pawtucket, Rhode Island.

Legacy
Governor Notte Park in North Providence is named after him.

External links
 Biography from National Governors Association Site
 The Political Graveyard
 BreezeObserver: Gov. Notte brought dignity, honor to his home town
Guide to the John A. Notte Jr. records from the Rhode Island State Archives

1909 births
1983 deaths
Democratic Party governors of Rhode Island
Lieutenant Governors of Rhode Island
Secretaries of State of Rhode Island
Politicians from Providence, Rhode Island
United States Navy officers
Military personnel from Rhode Island
20th-century American politicians
Catholics from Rhode Island